The Triple Crown of Motorsport is an unofficial motorsport achievement, often regarded as winning three of the most prestigious motor races in the world in one's career:
 the Indianapolis 500 (first held in 1911)
 the 24 Hours of Le Mans (first held in 1923)
 the Monaco Grand Prix (first held in 1929)

In different periods all three races were parts of various FIA World Championships: 
 The Indianapolis 500 was part of the World Manufacturers' Championship (1925–1928) and the Formula One World Championship (1950–1960).
 The 24 Hours of Le Mans was part of the World Sportscar Championship (1953–1992 except for the 1956, 1975–1979 and 1989–1990 seasons). Since 2012 it has been part of the FIA World Endurance Championship.
 The Monaco Grand Prix has been part of the Formula One World Championship since 1950 (except for the 1951–1954 and 2020 seasons).

Graham Hill is the only driver to have completed the Triple Crown. 19 drivers in motorsports history have competed in all three legs of the Triple Crown and have won at least one of the events. Juan Pablo Montoya and Fernando Alonso are the only active drivers to have won two of the three events, needing to win the 24 Hours of Le Mans and Indianapolis 500 respectively.

Alternative definitions

Including F1 Drivers' Championship
An earlier definition, as espoused by Triple Crown winner Graham Hill, and Jacques Villeneuve replaces the Monaco Grand Prix with the Formula One World Championship; Graham Hill is also the only driver to have accomplished this, winning the F1 Drivers' Title in 1962 and 1968.

Endurance racing
Triple Crown in endurance racing features Le Mans and has added the 24 Hours of Daytona and the 12 Hours of Sebring. This crown has been won by several drivers, namely A. J. Foyt, Hans Herrmann, Jackie Oliver, Al Holbert, Hurley Haywood, Mauro Baldi, Andy Wallace, Marco Werner and Timo Bernhard. Many drivers have come close to winning the crown with 2nd-place finishes in the third event, such as Ken Miles (who was famously denied the win by a technicality at the 1966 24 Hours of Le Mans), Mario Andretti (Le Mans 1995) and Allan McNish (Daytona 2012).

IndyCar racing

In the period of 1971–1989, Indy car racing contested their own Triple Crown. From 1971 to 1980 it consisted of the three 500-mile events on the calendar: the Indianapolis 500, Pocono 500, and California 500. Al Unser (1978) is the only driver to win all three in the same season. Ontario Motor Speedway was closed in 1980, and the California 500 was replaced with the Michigan 500. The triple crown continued through 1989, after which the Pocono race was discontinued. No driver won all three events during the 1980s.

The IndyCar Triple Crown was revived in 2013, with the 1971–80 format of the Indianapolis 500 (in May), Pocono IndyCar 400 (in July), and the MAVTV 500 (in October, held at Fontana). A $1 million bonus prize is offered for any driver to win all three races.

For 2014, Pocono returned to the 500-mile format, Fontana was moved to the season ending race in August and all three events awarded double championship points. Since the California 500's return under IndyCar sanction, it has been a night race.

In 2015, Fontana moved to July, while Pocono was the penultimate race of the season in August. Fontana was removed from the IndyCar calendar after 2015, and Pocono was removed from the IndyCar calendar after 2019

Of all variations of the IndyCar Triple Crown, only five drivers have achieved the feat over their career, with Al Unser the only one to achieve it in a single season.

NHRA
The term is often used during the season in the National Hot Rod Association to refer to its three most prestigious races, the Winternationals, the U.S. Nationals, and the Finals. The Winternationals is the event that kicks off the NHRA season, held during the second weekend in February, the U.S. Nationals is often called "The oldest, richest, and most prestigious race in the NHRA," and carries the largest purse of any event on the schedule, and the Auto Club Finals at Pomona are held to mark the end of the NHRA season.

Both the Winternationals, and the Auto Club Finals are held on the same track, Auto Club Raceway at Pomona, while the U.S. Nationals has been held at Lucas Oil Raceway in Indianapolis since 1961 (prior to that, the race was held on a now demolished track in Detroit). By far, the person with the most Triple Crown wins in his division is 16-time funny car champion John Force.

American motorsport
A. J. Foyt and Mario Andretti are the only drivers to have won both the Indianapolis 500 and the Daytona 500. Both drivers also won the 24 Hours of Daytona and 12 Hours of Sebring. Foyt won four editions of the Indianapolis 500, and collected seven open-wheel titles and a 24 Hours of Le Mans win. Mario Andretti won three editions of the 12 Hours of Sebring, the 1969 Indianapolis 500, and also won four open-wheel titles, a Formula One world championship, and a class win and 2nd overall finish at the 24 Hours of Le Mans.

Australian motorsport
In Australia, a driver is said to have achieved the "Triple Crown" if they win the Sandown 500, the Bathurst 1000 and the Supercars Championship (formerly the Australian Touring Car Championship) in the same year. Only two drivers have achieved this feat: Peter Brock in 1978 and 1980 and Craig Lowndes in 1996.

Active competitors who have completed two legs of the Triple Crown
, the only active drivers who have won two legs of the Triple Crown are Juan Pablo Montoya and Fernando Alonso. Both have won the Monaco Grand Prix (Montoya in 2003 and Alonso in 2006 and 2007). Montoya won the Indianapolis 500 twice (2000 and 2015) while Alonso has won the 24 Hours of Le Mans twice in 2018 and 2019 and competed in 2017's Indy 500, but retired on Lap 179 of 200 due to engine failure, after having led 27 laps. Alonso also entered the 2019 Indy 500 but failed to qualify for the race. In the 2020 Indy 500 Alonso finished 21st. Montoya entered the 2020 24 Hours of Le Mans, qualifying 21st and retiring due to an engine issue. Montoya again entered the 2021 24 Hours of Le Mans, qualified 18th overall and finished 15th, winning the LMP2 Pro-Am cup with Ben Hanley and Henrik Hedman.

List of Triple Crown winners
Events which make up the usual (Indy 500 / Le Mans 24hr / Monaco GP) and the alternative (Indy 500 / Le Mans 24hr / F1 WDC) definitions are included below.

The drivers listed below have completed two of the three legs for either version of the Triple Crown.

Key: Active drivers are highlighted in bold.

Notes

See also 
 Triple Crown
 List of winners of Triple Crown of Motorsport races

References

Sports car racing
Formula One
Monaco Grand Prix
24 Hours of Le Mans
Indianapolis 500
Motorsport terminology